Joanna Horton is an English actress, notable for her stage and television work, including an episode of Robin Hood (series 1 episode 4), Father Brown, Spooks and Foyle's War.

In 2009, Horton played Hannah in Days of Significance, written by Roy Williams, as part of the Royal Shakespeare Company, and played Barbara in The Gods Weep, written by Dennis Kelly, in 2010. In the same year, Horton also played Dunyasha in The Cherry Orchard, written by Anton Chekhov, at the Birmingham Rep, and Anna in Town, written by D.C. Moore, at the Royal & Derngate in Northampton. She appeared as Deb in an adaptation of Morgan Lloyd Malcolm's Belongings at Hampstead Theatre and Trafalgar Studios in 2011. During summer 2013 she appeared again with the Royal Shakespeare Company as Celia in As You Like It and Helena in All's Well That Ends Well. In 2017, she played Cassio in Othello at Shakespeare’s Globe.

Filmography

Film

Television

Theatre

References

External links
Agent profile website page

Year of birth missing (living people)
Living people
British stage actresses
British television actresses
British film actresses
21st-century British actresses